Myiotheretes is a genus of South American birds in the tyrant flycatcher family Tyrannidae. These superficially thrush-like birds are large tyrants (19–24 cm/7.5-9.5 in long) of the Andean highlands. 
The red-rumped bush tyrant is considered closely related.

Species
The genus contains the following four species:

References

 
Bird genera
Taxonomy articles created by Polbot
Taxa named by Ludwig Reichenbach